Fairview, Alberta may refer to:

Fairview, Alberta, a town in northern Alberta, Canada
Fairview, Alberta (hamlet), a hamlet in southern Alberta, Canada
Fairview, Calgary, a neighbourhood in the City of Calgary, Alberta, Canada
Fairview  Mountain (Alberta), a mountain in Banff National Park, Alberta, Canada
Municipal District of Fairview No. 136, a municipal district surrounding the Town of Fairview in northern Alberta, Canada

See also
Fairview (disambiguation)
Fairview Airport, an airport near the Town of Fairview in northern Alberta